Laguna Seca is a census-designated place (CDP) in Hidalgo County, Texas. The population was 266 at the 2010 United States Census. It is part of the McAllen–Edinburg–Mission Metropolitan Statistical Area.

Geography
Laguna Seca is located at  (26.278125, -97.924395).

History
The Laguna Seca Ranch was initially established in the year 1867 by Macedonio Vela Senior and his wife Mercedes Chapa Cantu. Approximately ten years earlier, Macedonio Vela Senior fled from Mexico to escape the wave of executions associated with the War of Reform. In 1867 he purchased one square league of the Santa Anita Land Grant from John and Salome Balli McAllen.

The first citrus trees in Hidalgo County were planted within the ranch property. In the year 1975 a historical marker was placed at the ranch. In recent times family members manage the ranch holding, although it is subdivided into three tangent parcels.

In 1871, his daughter, Carlota, grew the first orange trees in Hidalgo County from the seeds of a fruit given her by a traveling priest. This is now an important citrus-producing area. The ranch had grown to  when a school was built here in 1892. Delfina Post Office, named for another one of Vela's daughters, was opened in 1893 and a Catholic church in 1894. Laguna Seca Ranch is still owned by the Vela family. (1975) A historic cemetery exists on the ranch property.

Demographics
As of the census of 2000, there were 251 people, 68 households, and 62 families residing in the CDP. The population density was 111.4 people per square mile (43.1/km2). There were 75 housing units at an average density of 33.3/sq mi (12.9/km2). The racial makeup of the CDP was 75.70% White, 0.40% African American, 3.19% Native American, 19.92% from other races, and 0.80% from two or more races. Hispanic or Latino of any race were 98.80% of the population.

There were 68 households, out of which 36.8% had children under the age of 18 living with them, 67.6% were married couples living together, 17.6% had a female householder with no husband present, and 7.4% were non-families. 4.4% of all households were made up of individuals, and 1.5% had someone living alone who was 65 years of age or older. The average household size was 3.69 and the average family size was 3.84.

In the CDP, the population was spread out, with 34.3% under the age of 18, 7.2% from 18 to 24, 27.1% from 25 to 44, 18.3% from 45 to 64, and 13.1% who were 65 years of age or older. The median age was 30 years. For every 100 females, there were 112.7 males. For every 100 females age 18 and over, there were 98.8 males.

The median income for a household in the CDP was $29,063, and the median income for a family was $30,000. Males had a median income of $28,750 versus $20,250 for females. The per capita income for the CDP was $9,282. About 26.1% of families and 37.1% of the population were below the poverty line, including 29.5% of those under the age of eighteen and 52.2% of those 65 or over.

Education
Laguna Seca is served by the Edinburg Independent School District.

In addition, South Texas Independent School District operates magnet schools that serve the community.

References

Census-designated places in Hidalgo County, Texas
Census-designated places in Texas
Populated places established in 1867